The Impossible Man and other Stories is a 1966 collection of science fiction short stories by J. G. Ballard.

Contents
 "The Drowned Giant"
 "The Reptile Enclosure"
 "The Delta at Sunset"
 "Storm-Bird, Storm-Dreamer"
 "The Screen Game"
 "The Day of Forever"
 "Time of Passage"
 "The Gioconda of the Twilight Noon"
"The Impossible Man"

References

External links
The Terminal Collection: JG Ballard First Editions 

1966 short story collections
Short story collections by J. G. Ballard
Berkley Books books